Electric drag racing rules are very different from traditional drag racing. The common safety rules apply but additional rules apply depending on voltage, battery type, motor number and configuration.  The National Electric Drag Racing Association (NEDRA) oversees the majority of electric drag racing events in North America.

Electric motors produce 100% torque at zero RPM and this makes them quicker off the line compared to a piston-engined vehicle of the same power. Since battery technology has improved a great deal during the 1980s to present, the performance gap between piston-engined & electric-motor vehicles has narrowed.  The weight of the battery packs can impact overall performance raising 1/4 mile times.

Electric Drag Racing World Records

Motorcycles, 1/8 mile
In the drag motorcycle class, 48 volt NEDRA division, current world record is 7.800 seconds over 1/8 mile, set on 16 June 2010 by Silver Giant II at Mosten, Denmark. The lithium-ion polymer battery provides 48 volts and 600 amperes to each of four 24 volt motors for a combined power of around 100kW, although less than half that power reaches the rear wheel, because a large part is lost as heat in the motors. Dry ice is used to cool the motors to 5 °C between races. It has two gears, and the shift occurs automatically at  using CO2-pneumatics. It is built and raced by Danish Team True Cousins, who holds the record for the 24 volt division at 8.677 seconds.

Motorcycles, 1/4 mile
The current quickest electric vehicle in the world as of December 2017 is the "Rocket Bike", a motorcycle owned by Shawn Lawless and piloted by Larry "Spiderman" McBride, with a time of 6.940 seconds ET in the quarter mile at 201.37 MPH set at Virginia Motorsports Park in May 2012. Besides being the first rider to break 200 MPH in the quarter mile, Mr. McBride was also the first to break into the 6 seconds bracket with an electric vehicle. Larry "Spiderman" McBride is also the first to break into the 5 second bracket on a fuel powered motorcycle. This bike currently holds the NEDRA World Record in class DC3/MC in the National Electric Drag Racing Association.

The Battery pack was designed and built by Derek Barger and Rae Ciciora at High Tech Systems LLC in Colorado. Original Battery Management System BMS was designed by Steve Ciciora and Derek Barger. The Motorcycle was assembled at Orange County Choppers for the TV show.

Dragsters, 1/4 mile
The quickest pass from an electric car was set by Steve Huff. The dragster known as Current Technogy recorded an elapsed time of 7.52 seconds and a top speed of 201.07 mph at Tucson Dragway on May 14, 2020.https://www.stevehuffmotorsports.com/e-spec-racecars

Cars, 1/4 mile
2018
The TC-X electric door slammer made a perfect run at 7.98 seconds at the dragstrip at Mantorp Park in Sweden piloted by Glenn Nielsen, and since the previous run was 7.99, this confirmed the new world record. Top speed was 274 km/h (170 mph). After that run, True Cousins can now claim the current fastest times for electric car at both 1/4 mile and 1/8 mile.

The current quickest electric doorslammer car (that is with regular doors, in contrast with funny cars) is the Black Current III, owned by Sam and Olly Young of England. It currently holds the NEDRA World Record in the XS/A2 class at 9.64 seconds ET at 133.21 MPH. The record was set at Santa Pod Raceway in Northamptonshire, England on July 23, 2011.

The current quickest electric (door slammer) pick up, "Lemon Juice" is owned and driven by Shawn Lawless of Ohio. It currently holds the NEDRA World Record in the MC/A2 class at 9.957 seconds ET at 127.38 MPH.

Organizations
National Electric Drag Racing Association (NEDRA)

See also 
 Drag racing
 Electric dragbike
 Electric dragster
 Jet dragster
 Rocket dragster

External links 
 Current Record Holders
 National Electric Drag Racing Association
 Roadsters Embrace Green Racing
 Green Racing Initiative (U.S. Environmental Protection Agency)
 Michelin Green X Challenge.
 American Chemical Society

References 

 
Drag racing
Green racing